The Elaphiti Islands or the Elaphites ( or Elafiti) is a small archipelago consisting of several islands stretching northwest of Dubrovnik, in the Adriatic Sea. The islands are covered with characteristic Mediterranean evergreen vegetation and attract large numbers of tourists during the summer tourist season due to their beaches and pristine scenery.

Roman author Pliny the Elder was the first to mention the islands by the name Elaphiti Islands ( or Deer Archipelago) in his work Naturalis Historia, published in the 1st century. The name comes from the Ancient Greek word for deer (Doric: ἔλαφος), which, according to Pliny the Elder, used to inhabit the islands in large numbers.  There is, however, no evidence of deer ever inhabiting the archipelago.

Islands
Sources differ on the exact number of the Elaphiti Islands. According to a more recent classification, there are 13 islands in the archipelago, among them 8 larger (Olipa, Tajan, Jakljan, Šipan, Ruda, Lopud, Koločep and Daksa) and 5 smaller ones (Sveti Andrija, Mišnjak, Kosmeč, Goleč and Crkvine).

Main islands
Only the three main islands are permanently inhabited, each of which supports a modest tourist industry. They are connected with the mainland via daily ferry lines operated out of Dubrovnik.
 Šipan – The farthest and largest island in terms of area (15.8 km2) and population of 419 inhabitants. It  also has two settlements, Šipanska Luka and Suđurađ, both served by Jadrolinija ferry lines.
 Lopud – Second in size and best known for its sandy beaches, it is located between Šipan and Koločep islands. It's well developed in terms of tourism infrastructure, including the Lafodia hotel in the town of Lopud.
It used to be an important shipbuilding site in the Republic of Ragusa period. It is one of the most indented and the southernmost permanently inhabited Croatian island with a population of 163 inhabitants. It has seven pre-Romanesque churches dating from the 9th to the 11th century.

Other notable islands

 Crkvina – Uninhabited islet.
 Daksa – Uninhabited islet. It used to be home to a 13th-century Franciscan monastery of Saint Sabina, which was abandoned at the time of Napoleon's conquest in the early 19th century. Later, it became infamous as the site of the Daksa massacre, in which the partisans had executed 48 prominent citizens of Dubrovnik in October 1944.
 Goleč – Uninhabited islet.
 Jakljan – It has children’s rest and a recreation center.
 Kosmeč – Uninhabited islet.
 Mišnjak – Uninhabited islet.
 Olipa – The westernmost of the Elaphiti islands. It has a lighthouse located on its southern part.
 Ruda – Uninhabited islet.
 Sveti Andrija – Uninhabited rocky island with a rich fauna, has the status of a bird reserve. The island has a lighthouse, which the Austro-Hungarian government had built in 1873.
 Tajan – Uninhabited islet.

Greater Dubrovnik island
 Lokrum – Some consider it part of the Elaphites.

References

Bibliography

External links

Map including the Elaphiti Islands

 
Islands of Croatia
Islands of the Adriatic Sea
Landforms of Dubrovnik-Neretva County